Hitendra is an Indian masculine given name. Notable people with the name include:
Hitendra Wadhwa
Hitendra Thakur
Hitendra Narayan
Hitendra Kanaiyalal Desai
Hitendra Nath Goswami

Indian masculine given names